Port Said is a city that lies in northeast Egypt extending about  along the coast of the Mediterranean Sea, north of the Suez Canal. With an approximate population of 603,787 (2010), it is the fifth-largest city in Egypt. The city was established in 1859 during the building of the Suez Canal.

There are numerous old houses with grand balconies on all floors, giving the city a distinctive look. Port Said's twin city is Port Fuad, which lies on the eastern bank of the Suez Canal. The two cities coexist, to the extent that there is hardly any town centre in Port Fuad. The cities are connected by free ferries running all through the day, and together they form a metropolitan area with over a million residents that extends both on the African and the Asian sides of the Suez Canal. The only other metropolitan area in the world that also spans two continents is Istanbul.

Port Said acted as a global city since its establishment and flourished particularly during the nineteenth and the first half of the twentieth century when it was inhabited by various nationalities and religions. Most of them were from Mediterranean countries, and they coexisted in tolerance, forming a cosmopolitan community. Referring to this fact Rudyard Kipling once said "If you truly wish to find someone you have known and who travels, there are two points on the globe you have but to sit and wait, sooner or later your man will come there: the docks of London and Port Said".

Name

The name of Port Said first appeared in 1855. It was chosen by an international committee composed of Great Britain, France, the Russian Empire, Austria, Spain and Piedmont. It is a compound name which composed of two parts: Port (marine harbour) and Said (the name of the ruler of Egypt at that time), who granted Ferdinand de Lesseps the concession to dig the Suez Canal.

Urbanized residents pronounce the first syllable following Arabic; unurbanized residents pronounce it .

History

Port Said was founded by Sa'id of Egypt on Easter Monday, April 25, 1859, when Ferdinand de Lesseps gave the first symbolic swing of the pickaxe to signal the beginning of construction. The first problem encountered was the difficulty for ships to drop anchor nearby. Luckily, a single rocky outcrop flush with the shoreline was discovered a few hundred meters away. Equipped with a wooden wharf, it served as a mooring berth for the boats. Soon after, a wooden jetty was built, connecting the departure islet, as it quickly became known, to the beach. This rock could be considered the heart of the developing city, and it was on this highly symbolic site, forty years later, that a monument to de Lesseps was erected.

There were no local resources here. Everything Port Said needed had to be imported: wood, stone, supplies, machinery, equipment, housing, food and even water. Giant water storage containers were erected to supply fresh water until the Sweet Water Canal could be completed. One of the most pressing problems was the lack of stone. Early buildings were often imported in kit form and made great use of wood. A newly developed technique was used to construct the jetties called conglomerate concrete or "Beton Coignet", which was named after its inventor François Coignet. Artificial blocks of concrete were sunk into the sea to be the foundations of the jetties. Still more innovative was the use of the same concrete for the lighthouse of Port Said, the only original building still standing in Port Said.
In 1859 the first 150 laborers camped in tents around a wooden shed. A year later, the number of inhabitants had risen to 2000 — with the European contingent housed in wooden bungalows imported from northern Europe. By 1869, when the canal opened, the permanent population had reached 10,000. The European district, clustered around the waterfront, was separated from the Arab district, Gemalia,  to the west, by a wide strip of sandy beach where a tongue of Lake Manzala reached towards the sea. This inlet soon dried out and was replaced by buildings, over time there was no division between the European and Arab quarters.

At the start of the twentieth century, two things happened to change Port Said: in 1902, Egyptian cotton from Mataria started to be exported via Port Said; and in 1904 a standard gauge railway opened to Cairo. The result was to attract a large commercial community and to raise its social status. In particular a sizable Greek community grew up. In 1907, the quickly growing city had about 50,000 inhabitants, among whom were 11,000 Europeans "of all nations". During the First World War, Port Said became home to an important Allied hospital. Due to the strategic location of Port Said intersecting Europe, Africa and Asia, thousands of men were sent to this hospital. This included soldiers wounded as a result from the Gallipoli campaign in 1915. Following the end of the World War I, the directors of the Suez Canal Company decided to create a new city on the Asian bank, building 300 houses for its labourers and functionaries. Port Fouad was designed by the École des Beaux-Arts in Paris. The houses follow the French model. The new city was founded in December 1926.

Since its foundation people of all nationalities and religions had been moving to the city and each community brought in its own customs, cuisine, religion and architecture. By the late 1920s the population numbered over 100,000 people. In the 1930s for example there were elegant public buildings designed by Italian architects. The old Arab Quarter was swallowed up into the thriving city. Port Said by now was a thriving, bustling international port with a multi-national population: Jewish merchants, Egyptian shopkeepers, Greek photographers, Italian architects, Swiss hoteliers, Maltese administrators, Scottish engineers, French bankers and diplomats from all around the world. All lived and worked alongside the large local Egyptian community. And always passing through were international travelers to and from Africa, India and the Far East. Intermarriage between French, Italian and Maltese was particularly common, resulting in a local Latin and Catholic community like those of Alexandria and Cairo. French was the common language of the European and non-Arab population, and often the first language of children born to parents from different communities. Italian was also widely spoken and was the mother tongue of part of the Maltese community, since the ancestors of the latter had come to Egypt before the Anglicization of Malta in the 1920s. Multilingualism was a characteristic of the foreign population of Port Said, with most people continuing to speak community languages as well as the common French.

Since its establishment Port Said played a significant role in Egyptian history. The British entered Egypt through the city in 1882, starting their occupation of Egypt. In 1936 a treaty was signed between the United Kingdom and the Kingdom of Egypt called the Anglo-Egyptian Treaty of 1936. It stipulated the British pledge to withdraw all their troops from Egypt, except those necessary to protect the Suez Canal and its surroundings. Following World War II, Egypt denounced the Treaty of 1936, leading to skirmishes with British troops guarding the Canal in 1951.

The Egyptian Revolution of 1952 occurred. Then in 1956, President Gamal Abdel Nasser nationalised the Suez Canal Company. The nationalisation escalated tension with Britain and France, who colluded with Israel to invade Egypt, the invasion known in Egypt as the tripartite aggression or the Suez Crisis. The main battles occurred in Port Said, which played a historic role in the Suez Crisis. The withdrawal of the last soldier of foreign troops was on 23 December 1956. Since then, this day was chosen as Port Said's national day. It is widely celebrated annually in Port Said. The French-speaking European community had begun to emigrate to Europe, Australia, South Africa and elsewhere in 1946 and most of the remainder left Egypt in the wake of the Suez Crisis, paralleling the contemporary exodus of French-speaking Europeans from Tunisia. Most of the Greek community was also expelled or left the town under the rule of Gamal Abdel Nasser.

After the 1967 Arab-Israeli war, also called the Six-Day War, the Suez Canal was closed by an Egyptian blockade until 5 June 1975, and the residents of Port Said were evacuated by the Egyptian government to prepare for the Yom Kippur War (1973).
The city was re-inhabited after the war and the reopening of the Canal. In 1976, Port Said was declared a duty-free port, attracting people from all over Egypt. Now the population of the city is 603,787.

Economy

Port Said has been ranked the second among the Egyptian cities according to the Human Development Index in 2009 and 2010; the economic base of the city is fishing and industries, like chemicals, processed food, and cigarettes. Port Said is also an important harbour for exports of Egyptian products like cotton and rice, and additionally a fueling station for ships that pass through the Suez Canal. It thrives on being a duty-free port, as well as a tourist resort especially during summer. It is home to the Lighthouse of Port Said (the first building in the world built from reinforced concrete).

Due to its excellent geographic location, Port Said is designed to attract logistics start ups along with import and export businesses.

In 2019, the city witnessed the construction of the New Suez Canal, led by the Egyptian President Abdel Fattah el-Sisi.

East Port Said Industrial Zone

The government provides a number of incentives to investors in the scheme including zero tax and duties on tools, machines and raw materials related to the production of goods for export.

Geography

Climate
Port Said has a hot desert climate (BWh) according to Köppen climate classification, but blowing winds from the Mediterranean Sea greatly moderates the temperatures, typical to the northern coast of Egypt, making its summers moderately hot and humid while its winters mild and moderately wet when sleet and hail are also common, yet less common than in Alexandria because Port Said is drier. January and February are the coolest months while the hottest are July and August.

Port Said, Kosseir, Ras El Bar, Baltim, Damietta and Alexandria have the least temperature variation in Egypt, additionally, Mersa Matruh and Port Said have the coolest summer days of any other cities or resorts, although not significantly cooler than other northern coastal places.

Modern city

Districts

Modern Port Said is divided into seven districts:
Al-Ganoub District:
Al-Zohour District:
Al-Dawahy District:
Al-Sharq District:
Al-Manakh District:
Al-Arab District:
Gharb District:

There is also Port Fuad city  under the jurisdiction of the Port Said Governorate forming metropolitan Port Said.

Squares
Mansheya Square, in Al-Sharq district
Al-Shohda Square, in Al-Sharq district
AL-Mohafza Square (The governorate Square), in Al-Sharq district
AL-Sayed Metwaly Square (formerly Al-Estad Square), in Al-Manakh district
Volgograd Square, in Al-Manakh district
Bizerte Square, in Al-Zohour district
Haye Al-Zohour Square, in Al-Zohour district
AL-Horeya garden Square, in Port Fouad city

Recreational
Ferial Garden
The History Garden
Montaza Gardens
Al-Amal Garden
Al-Farama Garden
AL-Horeya Garden
Saad Zaghlul Garden
Restaurants Complex

Education

Colleges and universities
Port Said has a number of higher education institutions. Port Said University is a public university that follows the Egyptian system of higher education. The most notable faculties of the university are the faculty of engineering and the faculty of science. In addition, the Arab Academy for Science and Technology and Maritime Transport is a semi-private educational institution that offers courses for high school, undergraduate level students, postgraduate. It is considered the most reputable university in Egypt after the AUC American University in Cairo because of its worldwide recognition from (board of engineers at UK & ABET in USA). Sadat Academy for Management Sciences is an Egyptian Public Academy under the authorization of the Ministry of higher education.

Schools
Port Said contains about 349 schools in all different educational stages between governmental, experimental, private language schools beside French historical schools.

Transport

Port

The port of Port Said is the 28th-busiest seaport for container transport, the second-busiest in the Arab world (narrowly behind the port of Salalah in Oman), and the busiest container seaport in Egypt, with 3,470,000 TEU transported in 2009. The port is part of the Maritime Silk Road. It is divided into:
Port Said Port
East Port Said Port

The port is bordered, seaward, by an imaginary line from the western breakwater boundary till the eastern breakwater end. And from the Suez Canal area, it is bordered by an imaginary line extending transversely from the southern bank of the Canal connected to Manzala Lake, and the railways arcade livestock.

Navigation channels
 Main channel
Length: 
Depth: 

 East verge channel
Length: 
Depth:

Approach area

Dwelling area
The Suez Canal Dwelling Area is situated between latitudes 31° 21' N and 31° 25' N and longitudes 32° 16.2°' E and 32° 20.6' E. where vessels awaiting to accede Port Said port stay whether to join the North convoy to transit the Suez Canal to carry out stevedoring operations or to be supplied with provisions and bunkers. The dwelling area is divided into two sections:
The Northern Area is allocated for vessels with deep drafts. The Southern Area is for all vessel types.

Airports

The airport was reopened in February 2011 after being modernised to be fit for international flights. Scheduled flights from the airport ceased in 1996.

Motor highways
There are three main highways that connect Port Said to other cities in Egypt:

Train
The Port Said train station is on Mustafa Kamal Street and was built around 1904 when the Egyptian Railway Authority extended service in the region.

There are frequent train services from Cairo, Alexandria and other main Egyptian cities to Port Said. The travel time between Cairo and Port Said is about four hours while the Alexandria – Port Said route can be covered in about six hours. Intercity passenger service is operated by Egyptian National Railways. Tickets can be reserved online using the Egyptian National Railways website.

Ferry

Port Said is linked by ferry to its twin city Port Fouad which is considered the Asian part of this Afro-Asian governorate "Port Said" on the eastern bank of the Suez Canal, the ferry is used to cross the canal between the two cities, holding both people and cars as well (for free). The time between the two cities across the canal by using the ferry does not exceed 10 minutes.

Other means of public transport
Public buses are operated by Port Said Governorate's Agency for Public Passenger Transport. Private Transport also are available referred to as Micro Buses (14 seat minibus). White and blue saloon car taxicabs are comfortable, asking reasonable prices. Earlier trolleybuses existed in city.

Culture

Libraries
 
Port Said Library at the time of its inauguration reached about 14,000 books and was supplied by encyclopedias and modern references.

Theaters
Port Said Has about 11 Cinema theatres.
Port Said Opera House was inaugurated on 28 December 2016, where Arabic music, classical music, opera and ballet are performed.

Museums
Port Said National Museum is located on Palestine Street in front of the tourist jetty, near the centre of the city. It contains about 9,000 artifacts that narrate the story of Port Said and Egypt.
Port Said Military Museum was inaugurated in 1964. It is located in 23 July Street. It narrates the story of the Egyptian resistance in Port Said for the tripartite aggression during the Suez Crisis in 1956, and the wars of 1967 and 1973. It also contains a hall that narrates the genesis of the city and the Suez Canal.
Museum of Modern Art in Egypt is a modern and contemporary art museum, located in Shohada Square, in Port Said, beneath the Obelisk of Martyrs.
Museum of the Authority of the Suez Canal was inaugurated in August 2015. It narrates the story of the Suez Canal since its establishment.

Parks 
Port Said has 23 parks. which includes The Ferial Park 21904 square meter, The Farma Park 12469.4 square meter, The Khazanat Park 2000 square meter, The Aldawlia Park 8 Hektars.

Sports 

The main sport that interests Port Saidis is football, as is the case in the rest of Egypt and Africa, and Port Saidis are known for their enthusiasm in supporting the local team Al-Masry SC.

Al Masry Club Stadium is a multi-purpose stadium in Port Said. Built in 1954, it currently seats 17,988 and is used mostly for football matches, including the 1997 FIFA U-17 World Championship, 2006 African Cup of Nations, and 2009 FIFA U-20 World Cup.  The 2012 Port Said Stadium riot took place there.

The second most popular sport in Port Said is handball, and the city has a club called Port Said Club that won many local and African tournaments during the nineties.

Port Said Hall is an indoor hall located in the Sports City in Port Said. It hosts competitions of handball, basketball, and volleyball, and was used for the 1999 World Men's Handball Championship. It holds 5000 people.

Hockey, swimming, and other sports are also practiced on a lower scale.

Language 
Among speakers of Egyptian Arabic, the Port Saidi accent is unique. It is also called Abu Alarabi and Bambooti Accent.

Tourism

Port Said is a main summer resort and tourist attraction, due to its public and private beaches, cosmopolitan heritage, Museums and duty-free port, beside the other landmarks like the Lighthouse of Port Said, Port Said Martyrs Memorial that has the shape of the Pharaonic ancient obelisks and the building of the Suez Canal Authority headquarter in Port Said, also Tennis island situated in lake Manzaleh is a destination that attracts tourists to enjoy visiting this ancient Islamic city which was demolished during the crusades.

Ashtoum el-Gamil is a national park and Natural Protected area 
Location:
7 km west of Port Said on "Port Said-Damietta" coastal road (The Lake Manzalah is in connection with the Mediterranean through Ashtoum El Gamil .In front of the mouth of the Lake is located Tanees Island. All the area is a very important place for birds.) Area: 180 km2
Type: Nature Reserve
Year of establishment: 1988
Objective: Conservation of migratory birds
Management: The Egyptian Environmental Affairs Agency (EEAA).

Nearby to El Gameel area will soon launch a real estate mixed use project named "Downtown Portsaid". The project will cater to both residents and tourists as well as investors in the area, and is anticipated to be an attraction hotspot.

Notable people
Abdulrahman Fawzi, former Egyptian player in Al Masry, participated in the 1934 FIFA World Cup
Abdel Rahman Shokry, Egyptian poet
Amr Diab, Egyptian singer and composer and best-selling Arab recording artist
El-Sayed El-Dhizui, former Egyptian player in Al Masry and one of the top scorers in the Egyptian Premier League
Ahmed El Shenawy, Egyptian football player
George Isaac, Egyptian activist
Hans Dijkstal, Dutch politician "former Deputy Prime Minister"
Ibrahim El Batout, Egyptian director
Kamal Darwish, current president of Zamalek SC
Mohamed Atalla, engineer, inventor of MOS transistor, founder of Atalla Corporation
Mohamed Shawky, professional football player with Al Ahly
Mohamed Zidan, professional football player with Borussia Dortmund
Mosaad Nour, former Egyptian player in Al-Masry Club "the historic star of the team")
Mahmoud Yassin, Egyptian Actor
Soheir Ramzi, Egyptian actress
Yves F. Barbaza, born in Port Said, is a French World War I flying ace, credited with five aerial victories.

Twin towns and sister cities 

Port Said is twinned with:
Volgograd, Russia (1962)
Bizerte, Tunisia (1977)

See also

Container transport
Egypt Carrying the Light to Asia
List of cities and towns in Egypt
Closure of the Suez Canal (1956-1957)
Closure of the Suez Canal (1967–1975)

References

Further reading
Helen Chapin Metz, Egypt: A Country Study. Washington: GPO for the Library of Congress, 1990., Helen Chapin Metz, ed.

External links

Port Said Governorate official website 
Egypt state information service – Port Said 
History of Port Said (1859–1939) 
Port Said Port Authority
Port Said's Free-zone
Port Said history
Port Said Online 

 
East Port Said Industrial Zone
Governorate capitals in Egypt
Archaeological sites in Egypt
Populated places in Port Said Governorate
Populated coastal places in Egypt
Suez Canal
Metropolitan areas of Egypt
Mediterranean port cities and towns in Egypt
Nile Delta
Populated places established in 1859
1859 establishments in Egypt
1859 establishments in Africa
19th-century establishments in Africa
Cities in Egypt
Free ports